Julekake is a Norwegian Christmas cake. It is a yeast cake made with butter and sugar, spiced with cardamom, and containing candied fruits, raisins, and almonds. It is also sometimes called a "Christmas bread" instead of a cake. It can be eaten warm, or toasted and served with butter.

Preparation

The cake is made by mixing sugar with lukewarm scalded milk, salt, and cardamom then adding the yeast to the mixture, followed by the oats, butter, and egg. After the flour is folded in with the dried and candied fruits, the bread is kneaded and brushed with butter, then set aside to rise. There are two rises.

References

See also
Fruitcake
Limpa bread
Stollen

Norwegian breads
Christmas in Norway
Yeast breads
Christmas cakes
Raisins
Christian cuisine